The AEC 663T was a three-axle double deck trolleybus chassis manufactured by AEC between 1931 and 1937. Based on the AEC Renown bus chassis, three demonstrators were bodied by English Electric in 1930. Eighty-three were built for English operators including 60 for London United Tramways.

References

663
Trolleybuses
Vehicles introduced in 1931